Herefordshire County Cricket Club is one of twenty minor county clubs within the domestic cricket structure of England and Wales. It represents the historic county of Herefordshire. The team is currently a member of the Minor Counties Championship Western Division and plays in the MCCA Knockout Trophy. Herefordshire played List A matches occasionally from 1995 until 2004 but is not classified as a List A team per se.

Grounds
The club plays matches around the county at Brockhampton CC, Colwall CC, and Eastnor CC.  Matches were also played at Kington CC, Luctonians CC in Kingsland near Leominster, and Dales CC in Leominster in the past. (see List of Herefordshire County Cricket Club grounds)

Honours
 Minor Counties Championship (0) - ; shared (1) - 2002
 MCCA Knockout Trophy (2) - 2000 and 2016

Earliest cricket
Cricket probably reached Herefordshire in the 18th century, though possibly earlier.  The earliest reference to cricket in the county is dated 1823.

Origin of club
A county club was founded in 1836 but no longer exists.  The present county club was formed in 1992, with it joining the Minor Counties Championship in the same year as a replacement for Durham who had been elevated to the County Championship at the end of the previous season.

Club history
Herefordshire has won the Minor Counties Championship once, sharing the title with Norfolk in 2002. The county only joined the competition in 1992, replacing Durham, who were promoted to first-class status in the same year.

Herefordshire has won the MCCA Knockout Trophy twice since its inception in 1983. It won it in 2000 and 2016.

Notable players
See List of Herefordshire CCC players and :Category:Herefordshire cricketers
The following Herefordshire born or Herefordshire CCC cricketers made an impact on the first-class game:

England players born in Herefordshire:
 Reg Perks 
 Peter Richardson 
 Dick Richardson 
 Jack Sharp

England players who played for Herefordshire CCC
 Martin McCague After conclusion of first-class career
 Neal Radford After conclusion of first-class career
 Chris Woakes Before start of first-class career

First-class players
 Steve Adshead
 Mohammad Ali
 Kevin Cooper
 Ismail Dawood
 Naved-ul-Hasan Played for Pakistan
 Harvey Trump
 Alvin Kallicharan Played for West Indies

References

External sources
 Herefordshire County Cricket Club website
 Minor Counties Cricket Association Official Site

Further reading
 Rowland Bowen, Cricket: A History of its Growth and Development, Eyre & Spottiswoode, 1970
 E W Swanton (editor), Barclays World of Cricket, Guild, 1986
 Playfair Cricket Annual – various editions
 Wisden Cricketers' Almanack – various editions
 Ken Hook and Frank Bennett, Cricket in Herefordshire in the 20th Century, Logaton Press, 2007

 
National Counties cricket
History of Herefordshire
Cricket clubs established in 1992
Cricket in Herefordshire